The 2016–17 Weber State Wildcats men's basketball team represented Weber State University during the 2016–17 NCAA Division I men's basketball season. The Wildcats were led by 11th-year head coach Randy Rahe and played their home games in the Dee Events Center in Ogden, Utah as members of the Big Sky Conference. They finished the season 20–14, 12–6 in Big Sky play to finish in a tie for third place. As the No. 3 seed in the Big Sky tournament, they defeated Southern Utah and Eastern Washington before losing in the championship game to North Dakota. They were invited to the CollegeInsider.com Postseason Tournament where they defeated Cal State Fullerton in the first round to win the Riley Wallace Classic. In the second round, they lost to Texas A&M–Corpus Christi.

Previous season 
The Wildcats finished the 2015–16 season 26–9, 15–3 in Big Sky play to win the conference regular season title. They defeated Portland State, North Dakota, and Montana in the Big Sky tournament to earn the conference's automatic bid to the NCAA tournament. As a No. 15 seed in the NCAA Tournament, they lost in the first round to Xavier.

Offseason

Departures

Incoming transfers

2016 recruiting class
There were no recruiting class for Weber State of 2016.

2017 recruiting class

Roster

Schedule and results

|-
!colspan=9 style=| Exhibition

|-
!colspan=9 style=| Non-conference regular season

|-
!colspan=9 style=| Big Sky regular season

|-
!colspan=9 style=|Big Sky tournament

|-
!colspan=9 style=|CIT

References

Weber State Wildcats men's basketball seasons
Weber State
Weber State
Weber State Wildcats men's basketball
Weber State Wildcats men's basketball